Şəfəq or Shefek may refer to:
Şəfəq, Beylagan, Azerbaijan
Şəfəq, Goranboy, Azerbaijan